Mariedal is a residential area in Umeå, Sweden.

External links
Mariedal at Umeå Municipality

Umeå